The men's 5000 metres T13 event at the 2020 Summer Paralympics in Tokyo took place on 28 August 2021.

Records
Prior to the competition, the existing records were as follows:

Results

Final
The final took place on 28 August, at 9:40:

References

Men's 5000 metres T13
2021 in men's athletics